The 2011–12 MOL Liga season is the fourth edition of the international ice hockey championship for teams from Hungary and Romania. Following the withdrawal of Vasas HC, the field is composed of eight clubs this season, including five Hungarian and three Romanian. The regular season ran from 6 September 2011 to 20 January 2012.

After the conclusion of the regular season the six best ranked teams won the right to participate in the playoffs. Top two clubs had bye in the first round of the playoffs, while the remaining four teams were drawn together according to their final position in the regular season (3–6, 4–5). The winners of the match-ups advanced to the semifinals, where they met Dunaújvárosi Acélbikák and HSC Csíkszereda, respectively.

Eventually, Miskolci JJSE beat HSC Csíkszereda and thus secured their spot in the finals, where they faced Dunaújváros, which won their duel in straight matches against Corona Fenestela Braşov.

Dunaújváros enjoyed the home court advantage in the best-of-seven series final, where they swept away Miskolc with 4–0 and took the 2011–12 MOL Liga title, the first ever of its kind in the history of the club.

Teams

Regular season

Standings

Individual statistics

Scoring leaders 

The following players led the league in points at the end of the regular season.

GP = Games played; G = Goals; A = Assists; Pts = Points; +/– = Plus/minus; PIM = Penalty minutes

Leading goaltenders

The following goaltenders led the league in save percentage at the conclusion of the regular season. Only goaltenders who played at least 40% of the team's minutes are listed.

GP = Games played; TOI = Time on ice (minutes); SOG = Shots on Goal;  SVS =Saved Shots; GA = Goals against;  SVS% = Saving percentage; GAA = Goals against average

Playoffs

Bracket

References

External links
 MOL Liga Official Website
 MOL Liga at Scoresway

2011–12 in European ice hockey leagues
2011-12
2011–12 in Hungarian ice hockey
2011–12 in Romanian ice hockey